Julia Sinkevych is a Ukrainian film producer.

Career 
Sinkevych worked as the general producer of the Odesa International Film Festival from 2010 to 2020 and is a co-founder of the Ukrainian Film Academy. She is also a member of the Ukrainian Oscars Committee and the European Film Academy. Films she has produced include Heat Singers by Nadia Parfan, Close Relations by Vitaly Mansky, Lucky Girl by Marysia Nikitiuk, and Lesia by Nana Janelidze. In March 2022, she was named Jury President for the year's Series Mania film festival in Lille, France.

Personal life 
Sinkevych lived in Kyiv, but moved to her mother's home in Lviv during the 2022 Russian Invasion of Ukraine.

References 

Living people
Ukrainian film producers
Ukrainian women film producers
Year of birth missing (living people)